Noorpur Assembly constituency is one of the 403 constituencies of the Uttar Pradesh Legislative Assembly, India. It is a part of the Bijnor district and one of the five assembly constituencies in the Nagina Lok Sabha constituency. The first election in this assembly constituency was held in 1967 after the delimitation order (Delimitation Commission (1964)) was passed in 1964. The constituency ceased to exist in 1976 when the delimitation order (DPACO 1976) was passed. In 2008, the constituency was again created when "Delimitation of Parliamentary and Assembly Constituencies Order, 2008" was passed.

Wards / Areas
Extent of Noorpur Assembly constituency is KC Boodhpur, PCs Haizarpur Bhatt, Mahamdabad, Paijaniya, Shivala, Nayak Nangla, Sujatpur Tikar, Khaspura, Umribarhi, Chajupura & Chehla of Phoona KC & Noorpur MB of Chandpur Tehsil; KC Sahaspur, PCs Budhanpur, Kuri Bangar, Lamba Khera, Moh. Alipur Inayat, Pithapur, Sadafal of Seohara KC & Sahaspur NP of Dhampur Tehsil.

Members of the Legislative Assembly

Election results

2022

2018

2017

16th Vidhan Sabha: 2012 General Elections.

See also

Nagina Lok Sabha constituency
Sahaspur
Bijnor district
Government of Uttar Pradesh
List of Vidhan Sabha constituencies of Uttar Pradesh
Sixteenth Legislative Assembly of Uttar Pradesh
Uttar Pradesh Legislative Assembly
Uttar Pradesh

References

External links
 

Assembly constituencies of Uttar Pradesh
Politics of Bijnor district